Sils im Engadin/Segl (Romansh ), often also as Sils i.E./Segl, is a municipality and village in the Maloja Region, Upper Engadine in the Swiss canton of the Grisons.

It consists of two villages, Segl Maria (Romansh, ; Seglias is part of Segl Maria) and Segl Baselgia (German: Sils Baselgia; Baselgia is Romansh for church); the Val Fex (German: Fextal); and three Maiensässe (Alpine pastures traditionally used for spring grazing): Grevasalvas, Blaunca and Buaira, above Plaun da Lej on the left side of the valley.

Name and coat of arms
The municipality's official label uses both the German and the Romansh versions of its name: Segl is the Romansh version while Sils im Engadin is the German. Engadin is Romansh for "Valley of the Inn", the river, which flows northeast from Maloja through Sils Baselgia and eventually into the Danube at Passau, Germany at the German-Austrian border.

Sils i.E is distinguished from Sils im Domleschg in another Swiss watershed. Sils was originally divided into the three hamlets of Segl Baselgia, Segl Maria, and Seglias.

The coat of arms is Per fess Azure a Sun radiated Or and Or a Trout Azure spotted Gules. It shows a blue upper half with a golden sun and a yellow lower section with a blue trout. It is a combination of the historical village coats of arms, and represents the municipality's sunny, elevated location and the fish-filled Lake Sils.

History
Sils im Engadin/Segl is first mentioned around 800–850 as Silles. In 1131 it was mentioned as Sillis. Until 1943, Sils im Engadin/Segl was known as Sils im Engadin.

Geography

Located in the valley of Upper Engadine, Sils i.E./Segl nestles between Lake Sils and Lake Silvaplana at the foot of Piz Corvatsch and Piz da la Margna and below the Val Fex, a valley in the south. The municipality belongs to the Maloja District.

About 25.9% is agricultural, while 11.1% is forested. Of the rest, 1.2% is developed (buildings or roads) and 61.7% is unproductive. Rivers and lakes cover .

The plain is grass-covered, and the steep slopes are heavily forested.

Demographics
, 38.5% of the population are resident foreign nationals. In 2015, 144 people or 18.9% of the population were born in Portugal, 42 or 5.5% of the population were born in Germany and 63 or 8.3% of the population were born in Italy. Over the last 4 years (2010–2014) the population has changed at a rate of 2.13%. The birth rate in the municipality, in 2014, was 15.7, while the death rate was 1.3 per thousand residents.

, children and teenagers (0–19 years old) make up 17.3% of the population, while adults (20–64 years old) are 65.9% and seniors (over 64 years old) make up 16.8%. In 2015 there were 299 single residents, 381 people who were married or in a civil partnership, 37 widows or widowers and 44 divorced residents.

In 2014 there were 401 private households in Sils im Engadin/Segl with an average household size of 1.91 persons.  Of the 253 inhabited buildings in the municipality, in 2000, about 34.8% were single family homes and 36.0% were multiple family buildings.  Additionally, about 32.0% of the buildings were built before 1919, while 7.5% were built between 1991 and 2000. In 2013 the rate of construction of new housing units per 1000 residents was 26.46.  The vacancy rate for the municipality, was 1.2%.

The historical population is given in the following chart:

Languages
Most of the population speaks German (59.4%), with Italian being second most common (15.4%) and Romansh being third (12.0%). Into the 19th century, the entire population spoke the Upper-Engadin Romansh dialect of Putèr. Due to increasing trade with the outside world, Romansh usage began to decline. In 1880 about 68% spoke Romansh as a first language, while in 1910 it was only 56% and in 1941 it increased to 61.5%. In the 1960s German became the majority language. However, in 2000 there were 33% of the population who at least understood Romansh.

Politics
In the 2015 federal election the most popular party was the FDP with 28.5% of the vote.  The next three most popular parties were the BDP (24.0%), the SVP (18.5%) and the SP (16.9%).  In the federal election, a total of 169 votes were cast, and the voter turnout was 40.6%.

In the 2007, federal election the most popular party was the SVP which received 34.6% of the vote. The next three most popular parties were the SP (29.3%), the FDP (26.6%) and the CVP (7.2%).

Education
In Sils im Engadin/Segl, about 70.6% of the population (between age 25–64) have completed either non-mandatory upper secondary education or additional higher education (either university or a Fachhochschule).

Economy
Sils im Engadin/Segl is classed as a tourist community.

, there were a total of 955 people employed in the municipality.  Of these, a total of 24 people worked in 8 businesses in the primary economic sector.  The secondary sector employed 132 workers in 18 separate businesses, of which 5 were small businesses with a total of 94 employees.  Finally, the tertiary sector provided 799 jobs in 85 businesses.  There were 14 small businesses with a total of 338 employees and two mid sized businesses with a total of 201 employees. In 2014 a total of 26.5% of the population received social assistance.

In the second quarter of 2016 an average of 251 workers commuted from outside Switzerland to work in the municipality, representing a large minority of the employees.

In 2015 local hotels had a total of 196,257 overnight stays, of which 37.6% were international visitors.

Transportation

The Fex Valley is officially car-free except for residents of the valley. The Furtschellas cable car begins near the village and leads to many ski runs and, in summer, to trails above the tree line.

Climate

Sils-Segl Maria features a cold subarctic climate (Dfc) on Köppen classification.

Notable residents and visitors

Philosopher Friedrich Nietzsche summered in Sils in 1881 and between 1883 and 1888, and the house he lived in – the Nietzsche-Haus – is now a small museum. Anne Frank was in Sils for several vacations, and Hermann Hesse also visited Sils. Annemarie Schwarzenbach lived in Sils since 1935 and died there in 1942 after a bicycle accident.

In popular culture
The area is the setting for much of the film Clouds of Sils Maria (2014), written and directed by Olivier Assayas, and starring Juliette Binoche, Kristen Stewart and Chloë Grace Moretz. Part of Coda (2019), starring Patrick Stewart, was also filmed there, in the countryside and at the Waldhaus Sils Hotel.

References

External links

Official website of the tourist office
Official website of the municipality
Website for the Corvatsch-Furtschellas lift system (in German)

 
Populated places on the Inn (river)
Ski areas and resorts in Switzerland